Megan Lillian Jenkinson (born 1958) is a New Zealand photographer.

Background 
Jenkinson was born in 1958 in Hamilton, New Zealand.

Career 
Jenkinson works primarily as a photographer and is an associate professor at the Elam School of Fine Arts. 

In December 2005 Jenkinson traveled to the Antarctica as part of the Artists to Antarctica fellowship programme. Her photographs taken during this time we exhibited during the 2008 Photography Festival at Two Rooms Gallery and in 2007 at the Jonathan Smart Gallery in Christchurch.

In 2007 Jenkinson won the Jury Award at the Wallace Art Awards with her work Atmospheric Optics V. She has received the 1989 Montana Lindauer Art Award and the Graphics Prize at the 1999 Sharjah International Art Biennal.

Work by Jenkinson is held in the public collections of the Museum of New Zealand Te Papa Tongarewa; the Sarjeant Gallery, Govett-Brewster Art Gallery, Dunedin Public Art Gallery, Auckland Art Gallery Toi o Tāmaki, Aigantighe Art Gallery, Victoria and Albert Museum, Bibliothèque nationale de France, Centre Georges Pompidou, Museum of Fine Arts (Houston), Art Gallery of New South Wales, and National Gallery of Australia. She is represented in Auckland by Two Rooms and Chistchurch by Jonathan Smart Gallery.

Exhibitions 
Jenkinson has exhibited for over thirty years, both in New Zealand and internationally. Exhibitions include:
 2016, The Coincident Present, Two Rooms, Auckland
 2016, Other Space, Jonathan Smart Gallery, Christchurch
 2014, Double Vision, Bartley + Company Art, Wellington (with Mary-Louise Browne)
 2014, So Last Century,  Jonathan Smart Gallery, Christchurch (group show)
 2014, phyto-plasts, Two Rooms, Auckland
 2011, Drift, Two Rooms, Auckland
 2009, Second Silence, Jonathan Smart Gallery, Christchurch
 2007, The Dark Continent, Jonathan Smart Gallery, Christchurch
 2004, Afterword: The Colours, Colour Codes, and Cloud of Unknowning, Jonathan Smart Gallery, Christchurch
 1999, Sharjah Biennale (group show)
 1996, The Virtues (touring show)
 1990, The Readymade Boomerang: Certain Relations in 20th Century Art (Sydney Biennale, group show)
 1989, Esslingen Photo Triennale (group show)
 1989, Photography Now, Victoria and Albert Museum (group show)

References

Further reading 
Artist files for Megan Jenkinson are held at:
 Angela Morton Collection, Takapuna Library
 E. H. McCormick Research Library, Auckland Art Gallery Toi o Tāmaki
 Robert and Barbara Stewart Library and Archives, Christchurch Art Gallery Te Puna o Waiwhetu
 Fine Arts Library, University of Auckland
 Hocken Collections Uare Taoka o Hākena
 Te Aka Matua Research Library, Museum of New Zealand Te Papa Tongarewa
 Macmillan Brown Library, University of Canterbury

Living people
1958 births
Academic staff of the University of Auckland
People from Hamilton, New Zealand
New Zealand photographers